The engineering design process is a common series of steps that engineers use in creating functional products and processes. The process is highly iterative - parts of the process often need to be repeated many times before another can be entered - though the part(s) that get iterated and the number of such cycles in any given project may vary.

It is a decision making process (often iterative) in which the basic sciences, mathematics, and engineering sciences are applied to convert resources optimally to meet a stated objective. Among the fundamental elements of the design process are the establishment of objectives and criteria, synthesis, analysis, construction, testing and evaluation.

Common stages of the engineering design process

It's important to understand that there are various framings/articulations of the engineering design process. Different terminology employed may have varying degrees of overlap, which affects what steps get stated explicitly or deemed "high level" versus subordinate in any given model. This, of course, applies as much to any particular example steps/sequences given here.

One example framing of the engineering design process delineates the following stages: research, conceptualization, feasibility assessment, establishing design requirements, preliminary design, detailed design, production planning and tool design, and production. Others, noting that "different authors (in both research literature and in textbooks) define different phases of the design process with varying activities occurring within them," have suggested more simplified/generalized models - such as problem definition, conceptual design, preliminary design, detailed design, and design communication. Another summary of the process, from European engineering design literature, includes clarification of the task, conceptual design, embodiment design, detail design. (NOTE: In these examples, other key aspects - such as concept evaluation and prototyping - are subsets and/or extensions of one or more of the listed steps.)

Research
Various stages of the design process (and even earlier) can involve a significant amount of time spent on locating information and research. Consideration should be given to the existing applicable literature, problems and successes associated with existing solutions, costs, and marketplace needs.

The source of information should be relevant.  Reverse engineering can be an effective technique if other solutions are available on the market.  Other sources of information include the Internet, local libraries, available government documents, personal organizations, trade journals, vendor catalogs and individual experts available.

Design requirements
Establishing design requirements and conducting requirement analysis, sometimes termed problem definition (or deemed a related activity), is one of the most important elements in the design process, and this task is often performed at the same time as a feasibility analysis. The design requirements control the design of the product or process being developed, throughout the engineering design process. These include basic things like the functions, attributes, and specifications - determined after assessing user needs. Some design requirements include hardware and software parameters, maintainability, availability, and testability.

Feasibility
In some cases, a feasibility study is carried out after which schedules, resource plans and estimates for the next phase are developed. The feasibility study is an evaluation and analysis of the potential of a proposed project to support the process of decision making. It outlines and analyses alternatives or methods of achieving the desired outcome. The feasibility study helps to narrow the scope of the project to identify the best scenario.
A feasibility report is generated following which Post Feasibility Review is performed.

The purpose of a feasibility assessment is to determine whether the engineer's project can proceed into the design phase.  This is based on two criteria: the project needs to be based on an achievable idea, and it needs to be within cost constraints. It is important to have engineers with experience and good judgment to be involved in this portion of the feasibility study.

Concept Generation 
A concept study (conceptualization, conceptual design) is often a phase of project planning that includes producing ideas and taking into account the pros and cons of implementing those ideas. This stage of a project is done to minimize the likelihood of error, manage costs, assess risks, and evaluate the potential success of the intended project. In any event, once an engineering issue or problem is defined, potential solutions must be identified.  These solutions can be found by using ideation, the mental process by which ideas are generated. In fact, this step is often termed Ideation or "Concept Generation." The following are widely used techniques:

trigger word - a word or phrase associated with the issue at hand is stated, and subsequent words and phrases are evoked.  
morphological analysis - independent design characteristics are listed in a chart, and different engineering solutions are proposed for each solution.  Normally, a preliminary sketch and short report accompany the morphological chart.
synectics - the engineer imagines him or herself as the item and asks, "What would I do if I were the system?"  This unconventional method of thinking may find a solution to the problem at hand. The vital aspects of the conceptualization step is synthesis. Synthesis is the process of taking the element of the concept and arranging them in the proper way. Synthesis creative process is present in every design.
brainstorming - this popular method involves thinking of different ideas, typically as part of a small group, and adopting these ideas in some form as a solution to the problem

Various generated ideas must then undergo a concept evaluation step, which utilizes various tools to compare and contrast the relative strengths and weakness of possible alternatives.

Preliminary design
The preliminary design, or high-level design includes  (also called FEED or Basic design), often bridges a gap between design conception and detailed design, particularly in cases where the level of conceptualization achieved during ideation is not sufficient for full evaluation. So in this task, the overall system configuration is defined, and schematics, diagrams, and layouts of the project may provide early project configuration. (This notably varies a lot by field, industry, and product.) During detailed design and optimization, the parameters of the part being created will change, but the preliminary design focuses on creating the general framework to build the project on.

S. Blanchard and J. Fabrycky describe it as:
“The ‘whats’ initiating conceptual design produce ‘hows’ from the conceptual design evaluation effort applied to feasible conceptual design concepts. Next, the ‘hows’ are taken into preliminary design through the means of allocated requirements. There they become ‘whats’ and drive preliminary design to address ‘hows’ at this lower level.”

Detailed design
Following FEED is the Detailed Design (Detailed Engineering) phase, which may consist of procurement of materials as well.
This phase further elaborates each aspect of the project/product by complete description through solid modeling, drawings as well as specifications.

Computer-aided design (CAD) programs have made the detailed design phase more efficient.  For example, a CAD program can provide optimization to reduce volume without hindering a part's quality.  It can also calculate stress and displacement using the finite element method to determine stresses throughout the part.

Production planning
The production planning and tool design consists of planning how to mass-produce the product and which tools should be used in the manufacturing process.  Tasks to complete in this step include selecting materials, selection of the production processes, determination of the sequence of operations, and selection of tools such as jigs, fixtures, metal cutting and metal or plastics forming tools.  This task also involves additional prototype testing iterations to ensure the mass-produced version meets qualification testing standards.

Comparison with the scientific method
Engineering is formulating a problem that can be solved through design. Science is formulating a question that can be solved through investigation. 
The engineering design process bears some similarity to the scientific method. Both processes begin with existing knowledge, and gradually become more specific in the search for knowledge (in the case of "pure" or basic science) or a solution (in the case of "applied" science, such as engineering).  The key difference between the engineering process and the scientific process is that the engineering process focuses on design, creativity and innovation while the scientific process emphasizes Discovery (observation).

Degree Programs
Methods are being taught and developed in Universities including:
 Engineering Design, University of Bristol Faculty of Engineering 
 Dyson School of Design Engineering, Imperial College London
 TU Delft, Industrial Design Engineering.
 University of Waterloo, Systems Design Engineering

See also
Applied science
Computer-automated design
Design engineer
Engineering analysis
Engineering optimization
New product development
Systems engineering process
Surrogate model
Traditional engineering

References

External links 
 
 Ullman, David G. (2009) The Mechanical Design Process, Mc Graw Hill, 4th edition, 
 Eggert, Rudolph J. (2010) Engineering Design, Second Edition, High Peak Press, Meridian, Idaho, 

Engineering concepts
Mechanical engineering
Systems engineering